Viburnum species are used as food plants by the larvae of a number of Lepidoptera species including:

Monophagous
Species which feed exclusively on Viburnum

 Coleophoridae
 Coleophora viburniella
 Erebidae
 Zale horrida

Polyphagous
Species which feed on Viburnum among other plants

 Arctiidae
 Garden tiger moth (Arctia caja)
 Coleophoridae
 Coleophora ahenella
 Geometridae
 Autumnal moth (Epirrita autumnata)
 Common emerald (Hemithea aestivaria)
 Feathered thorn (Colotois pennaria)
 Winter moth (Operophtera brumata)
 Lymantriidae
 Brown-tail (Euproctis chrysorrhoea)
 Noctuidae
 Grey chi (Antitype chi)
 Satellite (Eupsilia transversa)
 Setaceous Hebrew character (Xestia c-nigrum)
 Small angle shades (Euplexia lucipara)
 Notodontidae
 Buff-tip (Phalera bucephala)

External links

Viburnum
+Lepidoptera